Peder Hersleb (25 March 1689 – 4 April 1757) was a Norwegian-Danish clergyman and Bishop.

Biography
Hersleb was born in Steinkjer in Nord-Trøndelag, Norway, the son of Christopher Hersleb and Sophie Borch. He became a student at Trondheim in 1703 and received a bachelor's degree in 1704, taking his theological examination in 1707. In 1713, he was awarded  a master's degree from the University of Copenhagen.

In 1714 he was appointed  a military chaplain. In 1718 he was called to minister at Gunslev on the island of  Falster, but the same year he was appointed  priest at Frederiksborg Castle and vicar in Hillerod and Roskilde. In 1725, he moved to Copenhagen as priest in the Danish royal court. In 1727, he was  a member of the Mission College and co-director of Waisenhuset Orphanage School  which he inaugurated in spring 1728. He served as Bishop of the Diocese of Oslo from 1731 to 1737. He published several collections of sermons.

In 1737, he was elected Bishop of Diocese of Sjælland. His daughter, Frederikke Louise Hersleb (1720-1780), married Ludvig Harboe, who worked with him in the diocese.  Hersleb died in 1757 and was buried in the cemetery  of the Church of Holmen. Ludvig Harboe  was appointed to replace him as Bishop.

References

1689 births
1757 deaths
18th-century Danish clergy
University of Copenhagen alumni
People from Steinkjer
Norwegian emigrants to Denmark
Danish Lutheran clergy
Danish Lutheran bishops
18th-century Norwegian Lutheran clergy
Norwegian Lutheran bishops
Bishops of Oslo
Sermon writers